In mathematics, an Appell sequence, named after Paul Émile Appell, is any polynomial sequence  satisfying the identity

Among the most notable Appell sequences besides the trivial example  are the Hermite polynomials, the Bernoulli polynomials, and the Euler polynomials. Every Appell sequence is a Sheffer sequence, but most Sheffer sequences are not Appell sequences. Appell sequences have a probabilistic interpretation as systems of moments.

Equivalent characterizations of Appell sequences

The following conditions on polynomial sequences can easily be seen to be equivalent:

 For ,

 For the same sequence of scalars,

where

 For ,

Recursion formula

Suppose

Let

be the inverse operator, the coefficients  being those of the usual reciprocal of a formal power series, so that

In the conventions of the umbral calculus, one often treats this formal power series  as representing the Appell sequence .  One can define

Then we have

(This formal differentiation of a power series in the differential operator  is an instance of Pincherle differentiation.)

In the case of Hermite polynomials, this reduces to the conventional recursion formula for that sequence.

Subgroup of the Sheffer polynomials

The set of all Appell sequences is closed under the operation of umbral composition of polynomial sequences, defined as follows.

Then the umbral composition  is the polynomial sequence whose th term is

Under this operation, the set of all Sheffer sequences is a non-abelian group, but the set of all Appell sequences is an abelian subgroup.  That it is abelian can be seen by considering the fact that every Appell sequence is of the form

and that umbral composition of Appell sequences corresponds to multiplication of these formal power series in the operator .

Different convention

Another convention followed by some authors (see Chihara) defines this concept in a different way, conflicting with Appell's original definition, by using the identity

instead.

See also

 Sheffer sequence
 Umbral calculus
 Generalized Appell polynomials
 Wick product

References

 
 .
   Reprinted in the book with the same title, Academic Press, New York, 1975.

External links
 
 Appell Sequence at MathWorld

Polynomials